Grimpoteuthis innominata is a species of small, pelagic octopus described by Steve O'Shea in 1999 from two specimens, however several further specimens have since been identified. The genus Enigmateuthis was described to contain this species when described, but Martin Collins placed the species in the genus Grimpoteuthis due to uncertainty regarding the type specimen of Grimpoteuthis.

Description and habitat
Grimpoteuthis innominata has been collected from the Chatham Rise to the east of New Zealand, with a bathymetric range approximately 1600 to 2400 meters depth, close to the seafloor (likely demersal). 

This octopus' mantle reaches 43 millimeters long, and a total length up to 156 millimeters long on the type material, it has an internal shell shaped like the letter "U". Some additional specimens captured since its description are somewhat larger, with a mantle length up to 77 millimeters. Its lobe-like fins and the shape of its shell help separate it from other species of Grimpoteuthis living in the Pacific Ocean. There are between 50 and 60 suckers on each arm of the octopus, and the suckers of males are larger than those of females.

References

Octopuses
Cephalopods of Oceania
Molluscs of the Pacific Ocean
Molluscs described in 1999
Endemic fauna of New Zealand
Endemic molluscs of New Zealand
Molluscs of New Zealand
Fauna of the Chatham Islands